Dictyonia is a monotypic genus of tropiduchid planthoppers in the family Tropiduchidae. There is one described species:  Dictyonia obscura from North America.

References

Auchenorrhyncha genera
Articles created by Qbugbot
Elicini